The Communist Youth League of China (CYLC), also known as the Young Communist League of China or simply the Communist Youth League (CYL), is a youth movement of the People's Republic of China for youth between the ages of 14 and 28, run by the Chinese Communist Party (CCP). The league is organized on the party pattern. Its leader is its First Secretary, who is an alternate member of the Central Committee of the CCP. The incumbent First Secretary is He Junke, appointed in June 2018 . The Communist Youth League is also responsible for guiding the activities of the Young Pioneers (for children below the age of 14).

History 

Founded in May 1920, it was originally named as the Socialist Youth League of China. Whilst the Party was officially established in July 1921, the Chinese Socialist Youth League was organized with the Party being set up throughout the country. In May 1922, the 1st National Congress of the League was held under the leadership of the Party, and therefore became a unified organization in China. In the 3rd National Congress in January 1925, the Chinese Socialist Youth League was renamed as the Chinese Communist Youth League. After the Sino-Japanese War, in order to adapt to the new social and political situation, it was officially renamed as the Chinese New Democracy Youth League in April 1949.

Later in May 1957, its name as the Chinese Communist Youth League was resumed, historically combining the congresses of all three leagues (the Chinese Socialist Youth League, the Chinese Communist Youth League as well as the Chinese New Democracy Youth League). During the 10 years of the Cultural Revolution, the functioning of the League was blocked and the Central Committee was disbanded as it was accused of revisionism; its functions were partly resumed in the early 1970s. From 1978 to 2008, six congresses were held.

The Communist Youth League has contributed a number of top echelon leaders of the CCP-led government of the People's Republic of China. The proliferation of leaders with a Youth League background has led to the informal name "Tuanpai" (abbreviation for "Youth League faction") being used to describe certain members of the leadership at different times. The first "Youth League faction" was represented by Hu Yaobang. The second "Youth League faction" is represented by Hu Jintao. While there is no direct political lineage between the two Hus, Hu Jintao's administration has formally elevated the memory of the earlier Hu. In 2005, the 90th anniversary of Hu Yaobang's birth, a new museum and a series of commemorative books and television programs were launched. The death of the son of Ling Jihua and Gu Liping, a couple associated with the Communist Youth League, may have tarnished the reputation of the organization as a path to power.

Current General Secretary Xi Jinping has sought to reduce the prominence of the CCP's youth wing, stating that "All they [cadres] can do is just repeat the same old bureaucratic, stereotypical talk". Political commentators have noted that the diminishing of the Tuanpai curtailed the influence of former paramount leader Hu Jintao, solidifying Xi's own political faction. Xi effectively closed the Central School of China Communist Youth League, folding it into the Chinese Academy of Social Sciences. He also demoted the league's chief and imprisoned one of its top officials.

Anthem 
In 1987, the first anthem of CYLC was composed.

Structure 
The national leading organization is the National Congress and the Central Committee, elected by the congresses. The National Congress are held each 5 years, but can be held earlier or later under special circumstances. In between congresses, the Central Committee implements the decisions made in the National Congress and leads the League as a whole; the Central Committee usually meets in plenary session once a year. In addition to the Central Committee, there are General Affairs Committees which oversee the daily affairs of the League and lead the organization in provincial-level administrative areas of the country.

By the end of 2002, there were approximately 210,000 committee members of fundamental organizations. 2021 estimates put the number of Youth League members at over 81 million.

Under the leadership of CCP General Secretary Hu Jintao, who was also a leading figure in the Youth League, key government positions at both central and provincial levels are more likely to be filled by the League's members and former cadres, known as tuanpai.

CYLC's official newspaper is the China Youth Daily.

List of First Secretaries 
Yu Xiusong: 1920–1922
Shi Cuntong: 1922–1925
Zhang Tailei: 1925–1927
Ren Bishi: 1927–1928
Guan Xiangying: 1928–1946
Feng Wenbin: 1949–1953
Hu Yaobang: 1953–1978
Han Ying: 1978–1982
Wang Zhaoguo: 1982–1984
Hu Jintao: 1984–1985
Song Defu: 1985–1993
Li Keqiang: 1993–1998
Zhou Qiang: 1998–2006
Hu Chunhua: 2006–2008
Lu Hao: 2008–2013
Qin Yizhi: 2013–2017
He Junke: 2018–present

Chronology of National Congresses 
1st National Congress (Socialist Youth League): 5–10 May 1922
2nd National Congress (Socialist Youth League): 2–25 August 1923
3rd National Congress (Socialist Youth League): 26–30 January 1925
4th National Congress: 10–16 May 1927
5th National Congress: 12–16 July 1928
6th National Congress (1st Congress, New Democratic Youth League): 11–18 April 1949
7th National Congress (2nd Congress, New Democratic Youth League): 23 June–2 July 1953
8th National Congress (3rd Congress, New Democratic Youth League): 12–25 May 1957
9th National Congress: 11–29 June 1964
10th National Congress: 16–26 October 1978
11th National Congress: 20–30 December 1982
12th National Congress: 4–8 May 1988
13th National Congress: 3–10 May 1993
14th National Congress: 19–25 June 1998
15th National Congress: 22–26 July 2003
16th National Congress: 10–13 June 2008
17th National Congress: 17–21 June 2013
18th National Congress: 26–29 June 2018

Social media
The social media accounts of Communist Youth League of China have engaged in harassment of foreign journalists. During the 2021 Henan floods the Communist Youth League asked its social media followers to locate and report the location of a BBC journalist on assignment covering the story. They also accused foreign reporters in general of slandering China with their reporting about the floods.

See also 
Komsomol
Kimilsungist-Kimjongilist Youth League
China Youth University for Political Sciences
All-China Federation of Trade Unions
All-China Women's Federation
Kuomintang Youth League

References

Attribution

External links 

 

 
Chinese Communist Party
Youth organizations based in China
Youth wings of communist parties
Youth wings of political parties in China
Youth organizations established in 1920
1920 establishments in China